Kim Hong Hee (born January 10, 1954), known as Kimera, is a South Korean-born singer. She developed the style of operatic pop, or popera performing and recording medleys of operatic arias set to a mid-1980s form of disco beat, singing in the soprano register.

Life and career
The third of five children, Kimera has loved singing ever since she can remember. From the age of twelve, she began singing in church choirs, as well as in the Korean National Metropolitan Choir. While attending university, she found she really enjoyed singing pop music as well. However, her father strongly disapproved of pop, which he felt was unsuitable, so she put her love for this genre aside, and eventually stopped singing completely. 
  
Kimera focused on her studies and graduated with a B.A. in French Literature from Sungshin Women's University in Seoul. She then left her native Korea to pursue a post-graduate degree in France, where she studied for an M.A., also in French literature, at the Sorbonne in Paris. While in Paris, her love for singing was reawakened, so she decided to enroll in the École Normale de Musique de Paris to learn operatic technique. After arduous vocal studies, she received in 1984 a Diplôme Supérieur d'Art Lyrique.

Unbeknownst to her parents, Kimera wanted to marry her love of modern music with her love for opera. This culminated in her deciding, in 1984, to set aside her promising career as an opera diva, to create the controversial classic-pop fusion recording, The Lost Opera, with the London Symphony Orchestra. The album promptly entered the British music charts and went on to gather momentum in France, Spain, South Africa, and other countries across the globe. 

In 1987, a personal tragedy occurred when her five-year-old daughter, Mélodie Nakachian, was kidnapped on November 9, and held for ransom for 11 days. Although her daughter was eventually recovered unharmed by the Spanish Grupo Especial de Operaciones, Kimera became reluctant to live a life of celebrity, as she blamed her public lifestyle for the unfortunate incident. As a result, she reduced public performances but continued to practice and record in her home studio at Estepona in the Costa del Sol region.

Stardom and controversy
Kimera, with her five-octave range and novel approach to operatic singing, has intrigued and fascinated many. Millions have embraced her unique opera-pop fusion embodied in various albums starting with The Lost Opera, which sold more than 10 million copies, followed by Opera Express and seven additional albums.

Her music style was that of pop opera, similar to pop symphony yet with more techno and High N-R-G beats. Her debut album was released in 1985, titled, The Lost Opera. Her second album, Opera Express and same-titled single were released in 1986. Both singles were edited 'radio friendly' versions from the continuous medleys found on aforementioned parent albums. Her music career stage was in Europe, mostly in France and Spain, but she also enjoyed tremendous success in South Africa with her debut single, The Lost Opera, reaching number 1 on the South African Springbok Charts in June 1985, and charting for 19 weeks. 

Called the blazing rebel of opera, Kimera blended two genres from opposite ends of the musical spectrum to create a new style of singing utilizing traditional operatic arias and a modern rhythmic pop beat. She called it "Popera", or "Opera Rock". While it was well received by the public, she endured a great amount of criticism from classical purists who believed she vulgarized opera, as a discussion if opera singers can sing pop and vice versa is ongoing. As one critic put it, "Mozart would turn over in his grave if he heard this." Criticism, however, did little to slow her down, since she was happy to popularize opera and make it more accessible to children and adults alike. Kimera responded to criticism by saying: 

Kimera never lost her love for music, nor the love and gratitude for the millions of people who supported her during her career. After a long period of silence, she has come back to her fans with the new album, With Love, Caruso (2008) recorded in collaboration with Adam Lopez.

Discography
 The Lost Opera (Medley) (1984, Kimera)  #1 in South Africa 
 Operathèque * The Lost Opera * Double CD (1984, Meloam publishing)
 Operatique: The Lost Opera (1985, Ariola)
 Opera Express (1985)
 Hits On Opera (with The London Symphony Orchestra) (1985)
 Marching Forever (1986)
 Madre (1988, Meloam Publishing)
 Kimera Sings Christmas (1990, Kimera)
 Femme Sauvage (1990, Meloam Publishing)
 Classic All Star (1993)
 With Love, Caruso (2008, Meloam Publishing)

Family
Kimera's real name is Kim Hong-Hee. In 1984, she married Raymond Nakachian (1932-2014), a wealthy Lebanese Armenian businessman; she gave birth to daughter Melodie and son, Amir. Her husband died in Estepona (Spain) on June 16, 2014. She currently resides in Spain.

Recognition
In 2008, she was chosen as the goodwill ambassador of the 2008 Korean Festival, organized by the Overseas Koreans Foundation.

See also
 Classical crossover music
 Hooked on Classics

References

External links
 Tracing the Queen of Pop Opera, The Chosun Ilbo, 18 February 2008.

1954 births
Living people
People from Daegu
South Korean expatriates in Spain
South Korean women singers
Sungshin Women's University alumni
École Normale de Musique de Paris alumni
South Korean sopranos